Miguel Ángel Cancela García (born 21 May 1993) is a Mexican footballer who played as a defender; his last club was Albinegros de Orizaba.

References

External links
 

Living people
1993 births
Mexican footballers
Association football defenders
La Piedad footballers
C.D. Veracruz footballers
Cafetaleros de Chiapas footballers
Albinegros de Orizaba footballers
Liga MX players
Ascenso MX players
Liga Premier de México players
Tercera División de México players
Footballers from Veracruz
People from Xalapa